The Hudson River is a  tributary of the Broad River in the U.S. state of Georgia. Via the Broad River, it is part of the Savannah River watershed.

The headwaters are in Banks County near the city of Homer. The Grove River feeds into the Hudson near the Franklin County line. The river then constitutes most of the southern border of Franklin County, separating it from Madison County. Nails Creek feeds into the river along this border, just before the Hudson itself feeds into the Broad River, south of the city of Franklin Springs.

See also
List of rivers of Georgia

References 

USGS Hydrologic Unit Map - State of Georgia (1974)

Rivers of Georgia (U.S. state)
Rivers of Banks County, Georgia
Rivers of Franklin County, Georgia
Rivers of Madison County, Georgia